Chaman Saver (also Romanized as Chaman Sāver) is a village in Chaharkuh Rural District, in the Central District of Kordkuy County, Golestan Province, Iran. At the 2006 census, its population was 135, in 39 families.

References 

Populated places in Kordkuy County